Clifford is both a toponymic surname of English origin and a given name deriving from it. It originated in several English placenames meaning "ford by a cliff".

People

Given name
Clifford Andrews (1912–1973), English athlete in cricket
Clifford Antone (1949–2006), American musical producer and club owner
Clifford Warren Ashley (1881–1947), American artist, author
Clifford Bax (1886–1962), English author and playwright
Clifford Berry (1918–1963), American inventor
Clifford Blackmore, Kansas politician
Clifford Edmund Bosworth (1928–2015), English professor, historian
Clifford Bricker (1904–1980), Canadian long-distance runner
Clifford Brown (1930–1956), American musician (jazz trumpeter)
Cliff Burton (1962–1986), American musician (bass guitarist, Metallica)
Clifford Campbell (1892–1991), Jamaican political figure
Clifford Carlson (1894–1964), American athlete in basketball
Clifford Carter (fl. 1980s-present), American musician
Clifford P. Case (1904–1982), American attorney and political figure
Clifford Chapin (born 1988), American voice actor working with Funimation
Cliff Clavin, fictional character on the television series Cheers
Cliff Couser (Clifford Couser, born 1971), American athlete in boxing
Clifford Ann Creed (born 1938), American female athlete in golf
Clifford Curry (1936–2016), American singer
Clifford Curzon (1907–1982), English musician (piano)
Clifford David (1938–2017), American actor
Cliff Davies (musician) (1948–2008), English musician (rock drummer)
Clifford Davis (politician) (1897–1970), American political figure
Clifford Davis (music manager) (fl. 1960s–1980s), American musician and manager of musical groups
Clifford Dupont (1905–1978), English-born political figure in Rhodesia
Clifford Durr (1899–1975), American attorney and civil rights activist
Clifford John Earle Jr. (1935–2017), American mathematician 
Clifford M. Eddy (C. M. Eddy Jr., 1896–1967), American author
Cliff Edwards (footballer) (1921–1989), English footballer
Clifford Evans (disambiguation), several people
Clifford Forsythe (1929–2000), Northern Ireland political figure
Clifford Brodie Frith (born 1949), English-born Australian ornithologist
Clifford Geertz (1926–2006), American anthropologist
Clifford Goldstein (born 1955), American author, Seventh-day Adventist editor
Clifford Goodman (1866–1911), Barbados athlete in cricket
Chris Graham (boxer) (Clifford Graham, 1900–1986), Canadian boxer
Clifford Grey (1887–1941), British songwriter, actor (also known as Clifford Gray)
Cliff Hammonds (born 1985), American basketball player
Clifford Hansen (1912–2009), American politician
Clifford Harper (born 1949), English illustrator, anarchist
Clifford Joseph Harris Jr., known professionally as T.I. (born 1980), American musician and producer
Clifford C. Hastings (1882–1946), New York politician
Clifford Heatherley (1888–1937), English film actor
Clifford Husbands (1926–2017), Barbados political figure
Clifford Irving (1930–2017), American author
Clifford Irving (politician) (1914–2004), British political figure (Isle of Man)
Clifford Jarvis (1941–1997), American musician (rock drummer)
Clifford Jordan (1931–1993), American musician (jazz saxophone)
Cliff Kincaid (born 1954), American investigative journalist
Clifford Alan King, American engineer
Clifford Henry Benn Kitchin (C. H. B. Kitchin, 1895–1967), British author
Clifford J. Laube (1891–1974), American Catholic poet, editor and publisher
Clifford Lincoln (born 1928), Canadian political figure
Carwood Lipton (Clifford Carwood Lipton, 1920–2001), British military figure
Clifford Lofvegren (1903-1969), American businessman, farmer, and politician
Clifford Longley, English journalist and author.
Clifford Sibusiso Mamba (born 1963), Swazi diplomat and former Olympic athlete
Clifford J. MacGregor (1904–1985), American meteorologist, Arctic explorer and naval aviator
Clifford May (born 1951), American author, political activist
Cliff McWatt (Clifford McWatt, 1922–1997), West Indian athlete in cricket
Clifford Meth (born 1961), American author
Clifford Mulenga (born 1987), Zambian athlete in football
Clifford Nass (1958–2013), American professor (Communications), author
Clifford Odets (1906–1963), American playwright, screenwriter, social activist
Clifford A. Pickover (born ), American mathematician, author
Cliff Pilkey (Clifford Pilkey, 1928–2012), Canadian politician and trade union leader
Clifford Joseph Purpur, known as Fido Purpur (1912–2001), American athlete in hockey
Clifford Ray (born 1949), American athlete in basketball
Cliff Robinson (basketball, born 1960), American athlete in basketball 
Clifford Robinson (basketball, born 1966), American athlete in basketball
Clifford Rose (1929–2021), British actor
Clifford Ross (born 1952), American artist
Ronnie Shows (Clifford Ronald "Ronnie" Shows, born 1947), American political figure 
Clifford Shull (1915–2001), American physicist (Nobel Prize)
Clifford Sifton (1861–1929), Canadian political figure
Clifford D. Simak (1904–1988), American author (science fiction)
Clifford Ian Simpson, known professionally as Kevin Abstract (born 1996), leader of boy band Brockhampton
Clifford Smith, known professionally as Method Man (born 1971), American rap singer
Cliff Spink (Clifford Spink, fl. 1980s-present), British military officer (Royal Air Force) 
Clifford Stein (born ), American computer scientist
Clifford Stoll (born ), American astronomer, computer expert, author
Clifford Taubes (born 1954), American mathematician
Clifford Thornton (1939–1989), American musician (jazz trumpet, trombone)
Clifford Joseph Trahan, known professionally as Johnny Rebel (singer) (1938–2016), American musician
Clifford Truesdell (1919–2000), American mathematician, historian
Clifford A. Ukkelberg (1904-1996), American farmer and politician
Clifford Walker (cricketer) (1919–1992), British athlete in cricket 
Clifford B. Wilson (1879–1943), American political figure
Clifford A. Wolff (born 1970), American attorney

Surname
Henry Clifford, 10th Baron Clifford
The Clifford family, an English noble family
The Clifford family (bankers), a family of English bankers active in the Netherlands
Alfred H. Clifford (1908–1992), American mathematician
Lady Anne Clifford (1590–1676), Countess of Pembroke
Augustus Clifford (1788–1877), British naval officer and court official
Bede Clifford (1890–1969), Governor of Mauritius from 1937 to 1942 
Betsy Clifford (born 1953), Canadian female athlete in skiing
Reese Buzz Clifford (1941–2018), American pop singer and songwriter
Charles Clifford (disambiguation), several people
Sir Charles Clifford, 1st Baronet (1813–1893), New Zealand politician
Clark Clifford (1906–1998), American Secretary of Defense 
Conor Clifford (born 1991), Irish athlete in football
Daniel Clifford (disambiguation) (or Dan), several people
Dermot Clifford (born 1939), English religious figure
Dennis Clifford (born 1992), American basketball player
Doug Clifford (born 1945), American musician, member of Creedence Clearwater Revival
Edward Clifford (1844–1907), English artist and author
Eleanor Clifford, Countess of Cumberland (Born Eleanor Brandon, 1519–1547), English noblewoman 
Esmond Clifford (1895–1970), British Royal Engineers officer
Francis Clifford (author) (1917–1975), pen name of Arthur Leonard Bell Thompson, author
George Clifford (disambiguation), several people
George Clifford (footballer) (1896–?), English athlete in cricket
George Clifford III, who engaged the Swedish naturalist Carl von Linné to write Hortus Cliffortianus
Gerald Francis Clifford (1889–1952), Wisconsin lawyer, politician and executive of the Green Bay Packers
Gordon Clifford, Australian rugby league footballer
Gordon Clifford (lyricist) (1902–1968), American lyricist
Graeme Clifford (born 1942), Australian film editor
Grahame Clifford (1905–1984), English opera singer
Henry Clifford, 1st Earl of Cumberland (1493–1542), British member of nobility in Skipton
Henry Hugh Clifford (1826–1883), British army officer
Howard J. Clifford (fl. 1930s), American political figure in Michigan
Hugh Clifford (1866–1941), British colonial administrator
Hughie Clifford (1866–1929), Scottish athlete in football
Jack Clifford (born 1993), Australian-born rugby union player who played for England
James Clifford (historian) (fl. 1970s–present), American university professor in California
James Clifford (musician) (1622–1698), English religious figure and musician 
John Clifford (disambiguation), several people
John Clifford, 9th Baron Clifford (1435–1461), British military leader
John Clifford (choreographer), former New York City Ballet principal dancer
John Garry Clifford (1942–2014), American historian
Johnny Clifford (1934–2007), Irish athlete in hurling
Joyce Clifford (1935–2011), founder of primary nursing
J. R. Clifford (1848–1933), American attorney, civil rights pioneer
Linda Clifford (born 1944), American female musician and singer
Lucy Clifford (1846–1929), British female author
Margaret Clifford, Countess of Cumberland (born Margaret Russell, 1560–1616), English noblewoman
Max Clifford (1943–2017), English publicist
Michael Gordon Clifford (born 1995), Australian guitarist from the band 5 Seconds of Summer
Michael R. Clifford (1952–2021), American astronaut
Mike Clifford (born 1943), American singer-songwriter and actor
Nathan Clifford (1803–1881), American statesman, diplomat and jurist
Patrick Clifford (disambiguation), several people
Paul Clifford (cricketer) (born 1976), English athlete in cricket
Richard Clifford (died 1421), British religious figure
Robert Clifford (disambiguation), several people
Rosamund Clifford ( – 1176), "Fair Rosamund", mistress of Henry II of England
Ross Clifford (born 1951), Australian radio personality, author
Sean Clifford (born 1998), American football player
Simon Clifford (born 1970), English football coach
Thomas Clifford (disambiguation), several people
Thomas Clifford, 1st Baron Clifford of Chudleigh (1630–1673), British politician and statesman
Thomas Clifford, 14th Baron Clifford of Chudleigh (born 1948), a British baron
Tom Clifford (politician) (fl. 1970s–2000s), Canadian political figure
Trevor Clifford (1927–2019), Australian botanist
William Clifford (disambiguation), several people
William Kingdon Clifford (1845–1879), English mathematician and philosopher

See also
Baron Clifford
Baron de Clifford
Clifford baronets
Lord Clifford (disambiguation)

References

Given names
Surnames
English-language surnames
English toponymic surnames
English masculine given names